Osenovo may refer to:

 In Bulgaria (written in Cyrillic as Осеново):
 Osenovo, Blagoevgrad Province - a town in the Bansko municipality, Blagoevgrad Province
 Osenovo, Varna Province - a village in the Aksakovo municipality, Varna Province
 One of two villages in the Simitli municipality, Blagoevgrad Province
 Dolno Osenovo or Lower Osenovo (Долно Осеново)
 Gorno Osenovo or Upper Osenovo (Горно Осеново)